INASP (International Network for Advancing Science and Policy) is an international development charity working with a global network of partners to improve access, production and use of research information and knowledge, so that countries are equipped to solve their development challenges.

Based in Oxford and governed by an international Board of Trustees, INASP is run with a small number of full-time staff working with, and through, partners and networks in over one hundred countries. INASP's work is funded by its partner countries, governmental and non-governmental development agencies, and philanthropic foundations.

History 
INASP original name, now superseded, was "International Network for the Availability of Scientific Publications".
It was established by the International Council for Science (ICSU) in 1992 to "improve access to information and knowledge through a commitment to capacity building in emerging and developing countries."

It was registered as a charity in 2004.

Work 
All the work of INASP aims to improve access to, and production and use of, research information and knowledge for sustainable development.

The charity focuses on the following key aspects of the research communication cycle:
 Availability and access to research publications
 Improving quality of research publications and communication
 Building demand for research information
 Supporting evidence informed policy making
 Strengthening research and knowledge networks
 Sharing learning and best practice

Projects

Global Platforms for Equitable Knowledge Ecosystems (GPEKE) 
The Global Platforms for Equitable Knowledge Ecosystems (GPEKE) project seeks to build stronger and more equitable research systems both between North and South, and in three focus countries: Uganda, Ethiopia and Cambodia in partnership with Ethiopian Academy of Sciences, Uganda National Council for Science and Technology, and Royal University of Phnom Penh.

AuthorAID 

The AuthorAID project has two key goals: to increase the success rate of developing country researchers in achieving publication; and to increase the visibility and influence of research in the developing world. AuthorAID achieves these objectives through networking, resources, training and mentoring.

See also
Open Access Scholarly Publishers Association, of which INASP is a member
Information Management Resource Kit (IMARK)
Dgroups

References

External links
 
 Publishers for Development 

Organizations established in 1992
Academic publishing
Academic journal online publishing platforms
International development charities